The Electoral district of Selby was a single-member electoral district of the Tasmanian House of Assembly. It centred on the town of Lilydale in Tasmania's northeastern region, and extended into what are today considered Launceston's outer eastern suburbs.

The seat was created ahead of the Assembly's first election held in 1856. The east and northeast of the electorate became part of the new seat of Ringarooma at the 1886 election. The seat was abolished at the 1903 election, when it merged with the neighbouring seat of Evandale to form the new seat of North Esk.

Members for Selby

References
 
 
 Parliament of Tasmania (2006). The Parliament of Tasmania from 1956

Selby